New Beginning is the second mini-album released by all-female Japanese hard rock band Band-Maid. It is the band's final release under Gump Records, as they joined Nippon Crown the following year. The album reached number 64 on the Japanese Oricon Albums Chart. The album was originally scheduled to be released on November 4, 2015, but was pushed back two weeks.

New Beginning has been described as hard rock, and heavy metal and the band's sound has been compared to the likes of Disturbed, Lenny Kravitz and Skunk Anansie. Music videos were produced for the songs "Thrill," "Real Existence," and "Don't Let Me Down."

Track listing

Personnel
Band-Maid
Saiki Atsumi – lead vocals (except track 7)
Miku Kobato – rhythm guitar, vocals, lead vocals on track 7
Kanami Tōno – lead guitar
Misa – bass
Akane Hirose – drums

Charts

References

2015 albums
Band-Maid albums
Japanese-language albums